Bel Air High School can refer to:

Bel Air High School (Bel Air, Maryland)
Bel Air High School (El Paso, Texas)

See also
 Bellaire High School (disambiguation)